Oreta insignis is a species of moth of the family Drepanidae. It is found in Taiwan, China (Hubei, Jiangxi, Hunan, Fujian, Guangdong, Hainan, Guangxi, Sichuan, Chongqing, Guizhou, Yunnan, Tibet) and Japan.

The wingspan is 36–44 mm. Adults are on wing in February and April.

The larvae feed on the leaves of Daphniphyllum glaucescens oldhamii var. oldhamii. The full-grown larvae turn over a leaf, which becomes like a funnel. Pupation takes place inside.

References

Moths described in 1877
Drepaninae
Moths of Japan